Ibrahim ibn Hussein was a Karakhanid ruler in Transoxiana from 1178/1179 to 1202/1203.

Biography 

Ibrahim ibn Hussein was the son of the Karakhanid Hussein 

According to Encyclopedia Iranica his full name was Sultan Qilich Ṭamgach Khan Ibrahim b. Hussein.

According to Karev, Ibrahim ibn Hussein came to power in 1178/1179. His residence was in Samarkand. He was the first to bear the Turkic title (ulug sultan al-salatin). Ibrahim issued coins in his own name under the title Arslan Khan.

According to Aufi Ibrahim b. Hussein composed poems in his youth.  

Ibrahim ibn Hussein wrote poetry in Persian and hand copied the Quran.

During the era of Ibrahim ibn Hussein, Taj al-Din Muhammad b. Adnan wrote such works as "History of Turkestan" and "History of China".

After the death of Ibrahim, his son Uthman ibn Ibrahim came to power.

References

Sources 

 Davidovich, E. A. (1998), "The Karakhanids", in Asimov, M.S.; Bosworth, C.E. (eds.), History of Civilisations of Central Asia, vol. 4 part I, UNESCO Publishing, p. 134-135.
 Kochnev B.D. Numizmaticheskaya istoriya Karakhanidskogo kaganata (991—1209 gg.). Moskva «Sofiya», 2006.

Turkic rulers
12th-century Turkic people
Year of birth unknown
12th-century rulers in Asia